Callicarpa elegans is a plant species in the genus Callicarpa found in the Philippines.

References

External links

elegans
Plants described in 1906
Flora of the Philippines